Sally Ida McClean  is a Northern Irish statistician, computer scientist, and operations researcher. She is a professor of mathematics in the school of computing at Ulster University, and a former president of the Irish Statistical Association. Topics in her research include workforce modeling, health administration, interactive architecture, and survey methodology.

Education
McClean was born in Belfast. She earned an MA in mathematics from the University of Oxford in 1970 and an MSc in mathematical statistics and operations research from Cardiff University in 1972. She completed a Ph.D. in 1976 at the Ulster University at Coleraine. Her dissertation, Stochastic models of manpower planning applied to several British and Irish firms, was supervised by Andrew Young.

Books
McClean's books include:
Statistical techniques for manpower planning (2nd ed., with David J. Bartholomew and Andrew F. Forbes, Wiley, 1991)
Questionnaire design: A practical introduction (with Noel Wilson, University of Ulster Press, 1994)

Recognition and service
McClean is a Fellow of the Royal Statistical Society, and Fellow of the Operational Research Society. She was the second president of the Irish Statistical Association, serving as president from 1998 to 2000.

References

External links

Year of birth missing (living people)
Living people
Irish statisticians
Women statisticians
Irish women computer scientists
British women computer scientists
Alumni of Queen's University Belfast
Alumni of the University of Oxford
Alumni of Cardiff University
Alumni of Ulster University
Academics of Ulster University